James Beggs may refer to:

James M. Beggs (1926–2020), American executive and NASA administrator
James Beggs (rower) (1924–2011), American rower

See also
James Begg (disambiguation)